Sar Tall, Sartol, Sar Tol, Sar-e Tal, Sar-e Tall, Sar-e Tol, Sar Tal or Sartal may refer to various places in Iran:
 Sar Tol, Fars
 Sar-e Tall, Hormozgan
 Sartol, Dehdez, Khuzestan Province
 Sartal, Kohgiluyeh and Boyer-Ahmad
 Sartol, Kohgiluyeh and Boyer-Ahmad
 Sartal-e Dingu, Kohgiluyeh and Boyer-Ahmad Province
 Sartal-e Melleh Gahar, Kohgiluyeh and Boyer-Ahmad Province
 Sar Tall, Khash, Sistan and Baluchestan Province